Vadym Dmytrovych Dobizha (26 February 1941 – 29 January 2023) was a Ukrainian football coach and player. He managed Sillamäe Kalev among other clubs.

Born in the Crimean ASSR in family of military pilot just before the Nazi invasion of the Soviet Union, during the war soon after his father's death, with his mother he moved to Luhansk.

Dobizha died in Sillamäe, Estonia on 29 January 2023, at the age of 81.

References

External links
 About Dobizha at the Luhansk Our Football portal
 Profile by footballfacts.ru

1941 births
2023 deaths
People from Simferopol Raion
Soviet footballers
FC Dynamo Saint Petersburg players
Soviet football managers
FC Khimik Severodonetsk managers
FC Zorya Luhansk managers
Ukrainian football managers
Ukrainian expatriate football managers
Expatriate football managers in Russia
Expatriate football managers in Estonia
JK Sillamäe Kalev managers
Merited Coaches of Ukraine
Association footballers not categorized by position
Recipients of the Order of the Red Banner of Labour